Fuglebakken station is an S-train station in Copenhagen, Denmark. It is served by the ring line.

See also
 List of railway stations in Denmark

References

External links

S-train (Copenhagen) stations
Railway stations in Denmark opened in the 20th century

Railway stations opened in 1936